Lisitsyno is a rural locality (a village) in Podlesnoye Rural Settlement, Vologodsky District, Vologda Oblast, Russia. The population was 2 as of 2002.

Geography 
Lisitsyno is located 12 km southeast of Vologda (the district's administrative centre) by road. Yeltsyno is the nearest rural locality.

References 

Rural localities in Vologodsky District